My Super D is a 2016 Philippine superhero fantasy drama television series directed by Frasco Mortiz and Lino Cayetano, starring Dominic Ochoa, Marco Masa and Bianca Manalo. The series premiered on ABS-CBN's Primetime Bida evening block and worldwide on The Filipino Channel on April 18, 2016, to July 15, 2016, replacing My Love Donna on April 8, 2016, and Game ng Bayan on April 15, 2016. This is Dominic Ochoa's very first lead role after playing supporting roles in numerous .

List of episodes

References

Lists of fantasy television series episodes
Lists of Philippine drama television series episodes